John Grisham (born 1955) is an American novelist, attorney, politician, and activist.

Grisham may also refer to:

People
 Grisham (surname), for people with the surname

Places and other uses
 Grisham Stadium, a multi-purpose stadium in Carrollton, Georgia, U.S.
 Grisham Township, Montgomery County, Illinois, U.S.
 Noel Grisham Middle School, Austin, Texas, U.S.

See also 
 Grissom (disambiguation)
 Gresham (disambiguation)